Government General Degree College, Gorubathan, established in 2015, is the government degree college in Lower Fagu, Gorubathan,  Kalimpong district. It offers undergraduate courses in science and arts. It is affiliated to University of North Bengal.

Accreditation
The college is recognized by the University Grants Commission (UGC).

See also

References

External links 

 Govt General Degree College Gorubathan
University of North Bengal
University Grants Commission
National Assessment and Accreditation Council

Universities and colleges in Kalimpong district
Colleges affiliated to University of North Bengal
Educational institutions established in 2015
2015 establishments in West Bengal